That's Not What I Meant! How Conversational Style Makes or Breaks Relationships is Deborah Tannen's first book presenting, for a general audience, her linguistic approach to explaining how ways of speaking affect relationships.  Predating by four years her phenomenally bestselling book about gender differences in ways of speaking, You Just Don't Understand, this book approaches communication and miscommunication from a linguistic point of view rather than a psychological one, emphasizing differences between the genders. The book lays out the linguistic devices and rituals that constitute "conversational style", such as indirectness, pacing, pausing, humor, overlap, and interruption, and shows their effects when styles differ.

See also
 Men Are from Mars, Women Are from Venus
 Nonverbal communication

References

Sociology books